Universal Content Productions (UCP) is an American television production company operating within the Universal Studio Group division of NBCUniversal.

History

Universal Cable Productions
In July 2008, Universal Cable Productions was split off from Universal Media Studios (UMS) and placed into NBCUniversal's NBCU Cable Entertainment division. Originally, UCP was set up to produce shows for NBCU and other cable channels, but has moved to producing shows for any network or channel, broadcast or cable. Its NBCU Broadcasting counterpart, Universal Television, has also moved to be a full-service TV studio.

Universal Content Productions
In early 2019, Universal Cable Productions changed its name to Universal Content Productions to reflect the move to streaming, with production of The Umbrella Academy for Netflix and Peacock. In October 2019, Universal Content Productions, along with Universal Television, was transferred from NBCUniversal Broadcast, Cable, Sports and News to NBCUniversal Content Studios.

UCP announced in November 2019 the 2020 launch of their podcast channel UCP Audio. The studio will produce both scripted and unscripted content with the first scripted podcast from Esmail Corp. It was announced that Dawn Olmstead would leave in order to join Anonymous Content. In February 2021, UCP started an Asian incubator program, with Soo Hugh being one of the first overall deals. In May 2021, Jennifer Gwartz joined the company after she left 20th Television. In 2021, Elliot Page has signed a deal with the studio.

Shows produced

Podcasts produced

References

External links
Universal Cable Productions at NBCUni.com
Universal Cable Productions at NBCU Media Village

NBCUniversal
Television production companies of the United States
Television syndication distributors
Mass media companies established in 2008
American companies established in 2008